Diane Parish (born 1 November 1969) is an English actress, who has been portraying  the character Denise Fox on the  BBC One soap opera EastEnders since 2006

Born in Chelsea, London and a graduate of the Royal Academy of Dramatic Art, Parish has appeared on British television for over two decades. She has appeared in a number of TV shows over the years, including the ITV dramas The Bill and M.I.T.: Murder Investigation Team playing Detective Eva Sharpe. She is also known for appearing in two series of the BBC One comedy-drama Lovejoy (1993–1994).

Career
After graduating from London's Royal Academy of Dramatic Art, she worked mainly in theatre, including playing Cordelia in Talawa Theatre Company's 1994 production of King Lear.

Parish has appeared in various television roles. In Lovejoy, she played Beth Taylor, the replacement for the character Eric Catchpole. Another television role was as Lola Christie, girlfriend of Mick McFarlane, the manager of the EastEnders night cafe, in 1998.

Parish has also appeared in television dramas including The Bill and its spin-off M.I.T.: Murder Investigation Team, playing DC Eva Sharpe. Before The Bill she starred in Babyfather, for which she received the Royal Television Society's best actress award in 2001 – the first black actor to win a major RTS award. Parish returned to EastEnders in May 2006, but this time playing regular character Denise Fox. She departed from the soap opera temporarily in January 2008 in order to give birth to her daughter, returning in June 2008. Parish also appeared as Millie in the 1996 film Indian Summer (also released under the title Alive And Kicking).

Filmography

Awards and nominations

References

External links 
 

1969 births
Living people
English television actresses
English soap opera actresses
British people of Montserratian descent
English people of Dominica descent
Black British actresses
Actresses from London
People from Tottenham
Alumni of RADA